The 1896 Yale Bulldogs football team represented Yale University in the 1896 college football season. The Bulldogs finished with a 13–1 record under first-year head coach Sam Thorne.  The team recorded nine shutouts and won its first 13 games by a combined 212 to 29 score.  It then lost its final game against rival Princeton by a 24–6 score.

Two Yale players, quarterback Clarence Fincke and tackle Fred T. Murphy, were consensus picks for the 1896 College Football All-America Team.  Leslie's Weekly also picked three other Yale players (ends Lyman Bass and Louis Hinkey and center Burr Chamberlain) as 1896 first-team All-America players.

Schedule

References

Yale
Yale Bulldogs football seasons
Yale Bulldogs football